Yahudi Ki Ladki (The Jew's Daughter) is a 1957 Indian Hindi drama film directed by S.D. Narang, starring Madhubala and Pradeep Kumar as leads. The film became a silver jubilee hit on its release in January 1957.

Cast
 Madhubala
 Pradeep Kumar
 Krishna Kumari
 Smriti Biswas
 Gajanan Jagirdar
 Amar
 Hiralal
Helen
 Tun Tun
 Sheela Vaz 
 Premlata

Music
The film had music by Hemant Kumar with lyrics by S. H. Bihari.
 "Hum Kisi Se Na Kahenge Chup Chup Se rahenge" - Geeta Dutt, Shamshad Begum
 "Ye Chand Bata Tune Kabhi Pyar Kiya Hai" - Asha Bhosle
 "Duniya Se Dil Lagake, Humse Aankhe Mila Ke" - Geeta Dutt
 "Aa Humse Pyar Kar Le" - Geeta Dutt
 "Ae Khuda Tere Bando Ke Dil" - Ravi, Hemant Kumar
 "Dil Bekarar Mera Kare Intezar Tera" - Hemant Kumar, Asha Bhosle
 "Kar Le Dil Ka Sauda Dil Se" - Geeta Dutt
 "Na Ho Dil Jiske Dil Me" - Geeta Dutt

Box office 
As per Madhubala's biographer Mohan Deep, Yahudi Ki Ladki was a box-office success and a silver jubilee hit, that helped the pairing of Madhubala-Pradeep Kumar in becoming popular.

References

Sources

External links
 
 

1957 films
1950s Hindi-language films
Indian black-and-white films
Indian historical drama films
Films scored by Hemant Kumar
1950s historical films
Indian films based on plays
Films set in the Roman Empire